The Atlantic Coast Conference awards championships in 26 sports—12 men's, 13 women's, and one coeducational (fencing, which was relaunched as an official conference sport in 2014–15 after having been absent since 1980).  In all sports except football and volleyball, champions are determined by a post-season tournament or meet.  In football, the teams with the best conference records from the Atlantic and Coastal Divisions play in the ACC Championship Game for the conference title.  The volleyball title is awarded based on regular-season play.

Summary
Through August 2016

Baseball

The ACC Baseball champion was determined by regular season finish from 1954 until 1972 and in 1979.  The ACC Tournament has determined the champion since 1973. All schools but Syracuse field a baseball team. Syracuse last sponsored baseball in the 1972 season, more than 40 years before joining the ACC in 2013.

†: No longer members of the conference

Men's basketball

All 15 full members sponsor men's basketball.

Women's basketball

All 15 full members sponsor women's basketball. The ACC began sponsoring women's basketball in the 1977–78 season.

Cross country

Men's
The 1953 and 1955 champions were determined based on regular season standings; all others have been determined at a post-season meet.  All schools sponsor men's cross country.

Women's
All 15 schools sponsor women's cross country.

Fencing

Four schools—Boston College, Duke, North Carolina, and Notre Dame—relaunched ACC fencing in the 2014–15 school year after the sport had been absent from the conference since 1980. Fencing was a men's sport during the first era of ACC fencing from 1971 to 1980. Today, ACC fencing is a coeducational sport, with teams fielding separate men's and women's squads and all bouts involving a single sex. Although the NCAA Fencing Championships award only a single team title, the ACC Fencing Championships award separate men's and women's team titles.

Field hockey
Seven schools—Boston College, Duke, Louisville, North Carolina, Syracuse, Virginia, and Wake Forest—sponsor women's field hockey.

Football

The ACC football champion was determined based on regular season finish from 1953 until 2004.  In 2005, the conference split into two divisions, and the division winners meet in the ACC Championship Game. Notre Dame is not an ACC member in football. They remain independent but have a yearly 5-game scheduling agreement with the ACC.

Golf

Men's
All schools except Miami, Pittsburgh, and Syracuse sponsor men's golf.

Women's
All schools except Georgia Tech, Pittsburgh, and Syracuse sponsor women's golf. The most recent additions to ACC women's golf were Clemson, which added the sport in 2013–14 (2014 season), and Virginia Tech, which added it in 2015–16 (2016 season).

Gymnastics

Women's
The ACC sponsored women's gymnastics for one season, 1984.  Duke discontinued their program following the season, and the conference stopped sponsoring the sport.  The conference initially planned to resume sponsoring gymnastics once Pittsburgh joined in 2013–14, but backed away from those plans once Maryland announced its 2014 departure for the Big Ten.

Lacrosse

Men's
Champions were determined through regular-season standings until 1988, after which time an ACC Lacrosse Championship tournament was held to determine the conference champion (with exceptions being in the 2021 and 2022 seasons, which again used conference standings). Five schools—Duke, North Carolina, Notre Dame, Syracuse, and Virginia—sponsor men's lacrosse with the most recent additions being Notre Dame and Syracuse, both added in the 2014 season (2013-14 school year). Former ACC school Maryland moved to the Big Ten Conference in 2015. North Carolina State sponsored men's lacrosse from 1973 to 1982.

Women's
Eight schools—Boston College, Duke, Louisville, North Carolina, Notre Dame, Syracuse, Virginia, and Virginia Tech—sponsor women's lacrosse. Maryland left the ACC in 2015 to join the Big Ten Conference.

Indoor track and field

Men's
No indoor championships were held between 1981 and 1986.  All schools sponsor men's indoor track & field.

Women's
All 15 schools sponsor women's Indoor Track

Outdoor track and field

Men's
All 15 schools sponsor men's outdoor track and field.

Women's
All 15 schools sponsor women's outdoor track and field.

Rowing

Nine schools—Boston College, Clemson, Duke, Louisville, Miami, North Carolina, Notre Dame, Syracuse, and Virginia—sponsor women's rowing.

Soccer

Men's

All schools except Florida State, Georgia Tech, and Miami sponsor men's soccer.

Women's
All schools except Georgia Tech currently sponsor women's soccer.

Softball
All schools except Miami and Wake  sponsor softball. Duke added softball beginning in the 2018 season (2017–18 school year), and Clemson has announced it will add the sport in the 2020 season.

Swimming and diving

Men's
From 1954 until 1961, the champion was determined by regular season competition.  From 1962 to 1964, the champion was determined by a combination of the regular-season finish and placement in the championship meet.  Starting with the 1965 season, the champion has been determined by the championship meet. Miami currently competes in diving only, and Clemson, Syracuse, and Wake Forest do not compete in swimming or diving.

Women's
Syracuse and Wake Forest do not sponsor women's swimming or diving. Clemson dropped women's swimming after the 2011–12 season, and dropped women's diving after the 2016–17 season.

Tennis

Men's
Before 1964, the team champion was based on regular season performance. Thirteen current members sponsor men's tennis, Pittsburgh and Syracuse the exceptions.

Women's
All 15 schools sponsored women's tennis until Pittsburgh discontinued its program in 2019. The other 14 schools all sponsor the sport.

Volleyball

Women's
All 15 ACC members sponsor women's volleyball. No member sponsors the sport for men.

The women's volleyball championship was determined through a tournament from 1980 until 2004.  Since 2005, champions have been based on the regular season.

Wrestling
The championship was determined on dual meets in 1954 and 1955, with the tournament beginning in 1956. Six schools (Duke, North Carolina, NC State, Pittsburgh, Virginia, and Virginia Tech) currently compete in wrestling. The most recent changes to the ACC include the entry of Pitt in 2013 and departure of Maryland in 2014.

Notes

References 

Atlantic Coast Conference
Atlantic Coast Conference